The 5 arrondissements of the Seine-et-Marne department are:
 Arrondissement of Fontainebleau, (subprefecture: Fontainebleau) with 85 communes. The population of the arrondissement was 156,193 in 2016. 
 Arrondissement of Meaux, (subprefecture: Meaux) with 142 communes. The population of the arrondissement was 343,169 in 2016. 
 Arrondissement of Melun, (prefecture of the Seine-et-Marne department: Melun) with 59 communes. The population of the arrondissement was 278,808 in 2016. 
 Arrondissement of Provins, (subprefecture: Provins) with 176 communes. The population of the arrondissement was 187,405 in 2016. 
 Arrondissement of Torcy, (subprefecture: Torcy) with 45 communes. The population of the arrondissement was 432,090 in 2016.

History

In 1800 the arrondissements of Melun, Coulommiers, Fontainebleau, Meaux and Provins were established. The arrondissements of Coulommiers and Fontainebleau were disbanded in 1926, and Fontainebleau was restored in 1988. In February 1993 the arrondissement of Noisiel was created from parts of the arrondissements of Melun and Meaux. Torcy replaced Noisiel as subprefecture in April 1994. In January 2006 the arrondissement of Provins absorbed the canton of Rebais from the arrondissement of Meaux and the canton of Rozay-en-Brie from the arrondissement of Melun.

The borders of the arrondissements of Seine-et-Marne were changed in January 2017:
 seven communes from the arrondissement of Fontainebleau to the arrondissement of Provins
 10 communes from the arrondissement of Melun to the arrondissement of Fontainebleau
 15 communes from the arrondissement of Melun to the arrondissement of Provins
 seven communes from the arrondissement of Melun to the arrondissement of Torcy
 10 communes from the arrondissement of Provins to the arrondissement of Meaux
 five communes from the arrondissement of Torcy to the arrondissement of Meaux
 two communes from the arrondissement of Torcy to the arrondissement of Provins

In August 2018 the communes Villeneuve-le-Comte and Villeneuve-Saint-Denis passed from the arrondissement of Provins to the arrondissement of Torcy.

References

Seine-et-Marne
Arrondissements of Seine-et-Marne